Kumara may refer to:

Places
 Kumara (Mali), a province
 Kumara, New Zealand, a town 
 Kumara (New Zealand electorate), a Parliamentary electorate

Other uses
 Kumara Illangasinghe, an Anglican bishop in Sri Lanka
 Kumara (surname)
 The Four Kumaras, sages from the Hindu tradition
 Sweet potato, called kumara in New Zealand
 Sweet potato cultivation in Polynesia, for information about kumara in a Polynesian context
 Kumara (plant), a genus of plants from South Africa related to Aloe
 A Hindu god and general, also named Kartikeya
Kumārasambhava, ancient Indian epic by Kalidasa about Kartikeya
 Agrius convolvuli, also named kumara moth